Tropical Storm Allison was a tropical storm that devastated southeast Texas in June of the 2001 Atlantic hurricane season. An arguable example of the "brown ocean effect", Allison lasted unusually long for a June storm, remaining tropical or subtropical for 16 days, most of which was when the storm was over land dumping torrential rainfall. The storm developed from a tropical wave in the northern Gulf of Mexico on June 4, 2001, and struck the upper Texas coast shortly thereafter. It drifted northward through the state, turned back to the south, and re-entered the Gulf of Mexico. The storm continued to the east-northeast, made landfall on Louisiana, then moved across the southeast United States and Mid-Atlantic. Allison was the first storm since Tropical Storm Frances in 1998 to strike the northern Texas coastline.

The worst flooding occurred in Houston, where most of Allison's damage occurred: 30,000 became homeless after the storm flooded over 70,000 houses and destroyed 2,744 homes. Downtown Houston was inundated with flooding, causing severe damage to hospitals and businesses. Twenty-three people died in Texas. Along its entire path, Allison caused $9 billion (2001 USD, $13.22 billion 2020 USD) in damage and 41 deaths. Aside from Texas, the places worst hit were Louisiana and southeastern Pennsylvania.

Following the storm, President George W. Bush designated 75 counties along Allison's path as disaster areas, which enabled the citizens affected to apply for aid. Then the fourth-costliest Atlantic tropical cyclone and still the costliest Atlantic tropical cyclone that was never a major hurricane, Allison was the first Atlantic tropical storm to have its name retired without ever having reached hurricane strength.

Meteorological history 

A tropical wave moved off the coast of Africa on May 21, 2001. It moved westward across the Atlantic Ocean, retaining little convection on its way. After moving across South America and the southwestern Caribbean Sea, the wave entered the eastern North Pacific Ocean on June 1. Southerly flow forced the system northward, and the wave moved inland on June 3. The low-level circulation dissipated, though the mid-level circulation persisted. It emerged into the Gulf of Mexico on June 4, and developed deep convection on its eastern side. Early on June 5, satellite imagery suggested that a tropical depression was forming in the northwest Gulf of Mexico, which was furthered by reports of wind gusts as high as  just a few hundred feet above the surface, towards the east side of the system.

At 1200 UTC on June 5, the disturbance developed a broad, low-level circulation, and was classified as Tropical Storm Allison, the first storm of the 2001 Atlantic hurricane season. Some intensification was projected, though it was expected to be hindered by cool offshore sea surface temperatures. Due to the cold-core nature of the center, Allison initially contained subtropical characteristics. The storm initially moved very little, and the presence of several small vortices from within the deep convection caused difficulty in determining the exact center location. Later in the day, several different track forecasts arose. One scenario had the cyclone tracking westward into Mexico. Another projected the storm moving east towards southern Louisiana. At the time, it was noted that little rain or wind persisted near the center, but rather to the north and east. Under the steering currents of a subtropical ridge that extended in an east–west orientation across the southeast United States, Allison weakened while nearing the Texas coastline, and struck near Freeport, Texas with  winds. Inland, the storm rapidly weakened, and the National Hurricane Center discontinued advisories early on June 6. Shortly after being downgraded to a tropical depression, surface observations showed an elongated circulation with a poorly defined center, which had reformed closer to the deep convection.

The depression drifted northward until reaching Lufkin, Texas, where it stalled due to a high pressure system to its north. On June 7, the subtropical ridge off Florida weakened, while the ridge west of Texas intensified. This steered Tropical Depression Allison to make a clockwise loop, and the storm began drifting to the southwest. As the center reached Huntsville, Texas, a heavy rain band began to back build from Louisiana westward into Liberty County, Texas, which had caused additional flooding. Late on June 9 and early on June 10, Allison's remnants reentered reached the Gulf of Mexico and emerged over open waters. Due to dry air and moderate westerly wind shear, the storm transformed into a subtropical cyclone. While the subtropical depression moved eastward, a new low level circulation redeveloped to the east, and Allison quickly made landfall on Morgan City, Louisiana on June 11. At around the same time, the surface center reformed to the east-northeast of its previous location, aligning with the mid-level circulation. Strong thunderstorms redeveloped over the circulation, and Allison strengthened into a subtropical storm over southeastern Louisiana.

The storm was officially downgraded to a subtropical depression at 0000 UTC on June 12. Somewhat accelerating, the depression tracked to the east-northeast through Mississippi, Alabama, Georgia, and South Carolina before becoming nearly stationary near Wilmington, North Carolina. The depression drifted through North Carolina and sped to the northeast for a time in response to an approaching cold front. Though satellite and radar imagery show the system was well-organized, the system slowed and moved erratically for a period of time, executing what appeared to be a small counterclockwise loop. The storm began tracking in a generally northeasterly direction, and crossed into the southern Delmarva Peninsula on June 16. The subtropical remnants reached the Atlantic on June 17, and while located east of Atlantic City, New Jersey, winds began to restrengthen, and heavy rains formed to the north of the circulation. The remnants of Allison briefly reintensified to a subtropical storm through baroclinic processes, though it became extratropical while south of Long Island. By later on June 17, the low was situated off the coast of Rhode Island, spreading a swath of precipitation over New England. The remnants of the tropical storm were then absorbed by the frontal boundary by June 18, and eventually passed south of Cape Race, Newfoundland on June 20, where the extratropical cyclone dissipated.

Preparations

Shortly after the storm formed, officials in Galveston County, Texas issued a voluntary evacuation for the western end of Galveston Island, as the area was not protected by the Galveston Seawall. The ferry from the island to the Bolivar Peninsula was closed, while voluntary evacuations were issued in Surfside in Brazoria County. When the National Hurricane Center issued the first advisory on Allison, officials issued Tropical Storm Warnings from Sargent, Texas to Morgan City, Louisiana. After the storm made landfall, flash flood watches and warnings were issued for numerous areas in eastern Texas. During the flood event, the National Weather Service in Houston issued 99 flash flood warnings with an average lead time of 40 minutes. With an average lead time of 24 minutes, the National Weather Service in Lake Charles, Louisiana issued 47 flash flood warnings. With an average lead time of 39 minutes, the National Weather Service in New Orleans/Baton Rouge issued 87 flash flood warnings, of which 30 were not followed by a flash flood.

In Tallahassee, Florida, a shelter opened the day before Allison's movement northward through the area, seven staff members housing 12 people. Two other shelters were on standby. Teams informed citizens in the Florida Panhandle of flood dangers.

Impact

Tropical Storm Allison was a major flood disaster throughout its path from Texas to the Mid-Atlantic. Allison caused approximately $8.5 billion in damage (2001 USD), making it the costliest tropical cyclone that was never a major hurricane on record in the Atlantic basin. The storm also killed 41 people directly, including 27 who drowned. This ties Allison with a tropical storm in 1917 as the second-deadliest tropical storm to affect the contiguous United States, surpassed only by the 1925 Florida tropical storm which killed 73 people.

Texas

Combined with waves on top, areas of Galveston Island experienced a wall of water  in height, creating overwash along the coastline. While Allison was stalling over Texas, it dropped very heavy rainfall across the state. Minimal beach erosion was reported. Houston experienced torrential rainfall in a short amount of time. Houston Hobby Airport received 20.84 inches of rain from June 5 to 10, 2001, while Bush Intercontinental Airport received 16.48 inches. The deluge of rainfall flooded 95,000 automobiles and 73,000 houses throughout Harris County. Tropical Storm Allison destroyed 2,744 homes, leaving 30,000 homeless with residential damages totaling $1.76 billion (2001 USD).

Several hospitals in the Texas Medical Center, the largest medical complex in the world, experienced severe damage from the storm, which hit quickly and with unexpected fury on a Friday evening. The Baylor College of Medicine experienced major damage, totaling $495 million (2001 USD, $643 million 2012 USD). The medical school lost 90,000 research animals, 60,000 tumor samples, and 25 years of research data. The University of Texas Health Science Center at Houston, across the street, lost thousands of laboratory animals. Throughout the Medical Center, damage totaled over $2 billion (2001 USD).

The tunnel system, which connects most large office buildings in downtown Houston, was submerged, as were many streets and parking garages adjacent to Buffalo Bayou. At the Houston Theater District, also in downtown, the Houston Symphony, Houston Grand Opera, and Alley Theater lost millions of dollars of costumes, musical instruments, sheet music, archives and other artifacts. By midnight on June 9 nearly every freeway and major road in the city was under several feet of water, forcing hundreds of motorists to abandon their vehicles for higher ground.

Despite massive flooding damage to entire neighborhoods, no one drowned in the flooded houses. In the area, there were twelve deaths from driving, six from walking, three from electrocution, and one in an elevator. Elsewhere in Texas, a man drowned when swimming in a ditch in Mauriceville. Damage totaled $5.2 billion (2001 USD) throughout Texas.

Louisiana

While making its first landfall, Allison's large circulation dropped severe rains on southwest Louisiana. Days later, Allison hit the state as a subtropical storm, dropping more heavy rains to the area. Most of the southeastern portion of the state experienced over 10 inches of rain (255 mm). While moving northward through Texas, the outer bands of the storm produced an F1 tornado near Zachary, damaging several trees and a power line. A man was killed when a damaged power line hit his truck.

When Allison first made landfall, heavy rainfall flooded numerous houses and businesses. Minor wind gusts caused minor roof damage to 10 houses in Cameron Parish, while its storm surge flooded portions of Louisiana Highway 82. When the system returned, more rainfall occurred, flooding over 1,000 houses in St. Tammany Parish, 80 houses in Saint Bernard Parish, and hundreds of houses elsewhere in the state. The flooding also forced 1,800 residents from their homes in East Baton Rouge Parish. The deluge left numerous roads impassable, while runoff resulted in severe river flooding. The Bogue Falaya River in Covington crested past its peak twice to near-record levels. The Amite and Comite Rivers reached their highest levels since 1983. In addition, the levee along the Bayou Manchac broke, flooding roadways and more houses. Damage in Louisiana totaled to $65 million (2001 USD, $84 million 2012 USD).

Southeast United States

The flooding damaged numerous houses and flooded many roadways. Thunderstorms from the storm produced four tornadoes, including one in Gulfport, Mississippi that damaged 10 houses. Severe thunderstorms in George County damaged 15 houses, destroyed 10, and injured 5 people. Damage in Mississippi totaled to over $1 million (2001 USD, $1.3 million 2012 USD). Heavy rainfall closed several roads in Crenshaw County. The storm, combined with a high pressure, produced coastal flooding in southern Alabama. Allison produced an F0 tornado in southwest Mobile County that caused minor roof damage and another F0 tornado in Covington County that caused minor damage to six homes and a church.

The storm, combined with a high pressure system, produced a strong pressure gradient, resulting in strong rip currents off the coast of Florida. The currents prompted sirens, which are normally used for storm warnings, to be activated in Pensacola Beach. The rip currents killed 5 off the coast of Florida. The Tallahassee Regional Airport recorded  in 24 hours, breaking the old 24‑hour record set in 1969. Throughout the state, Allison destroyed 10 homes and damaged 599, 196 severely, primarily in Leon County. Including the deaths from rip currents, Allison killed eight people in Florida and caused $20 million (2001 USD, $26 million 2012 USD) in damage.

The rainfall, which was heaviest across the southwestern portion of the state, washed out several bridges and roads, and flooded many other roads. Georgia governor Roy Barnes declared a state of emergency for seven counties in the state. The storm also spawned two tornadoes. In South Carolina, Allison's outer bands produced 10 tornadoes and several funnel clouds, though most only caused minor damage limited to a damaged courthouse, snapped trees and downed power lines. The severe flooding washed out a bridge in eastern Halifax County and flooded numerous cars. Wet roads caused nine traffic accidents throughout the state.

Mid-Atlantic and Northeast United States
A tree in a saturated ground fell over and killed one person. Allison also produced one tornado in the state. Washington, D.C. experienced moderate rainfall from the storm, totaling  in Georgetown. The Maryland Eastern Shore experienced only minor rainfall from one to two inches (25 to 50 mm). Damage was light, and no deaths were reported. No damage was reported.

The rainfall downed numerous weak trees and power lines, leaving 70,000 without power during the storm. The flooding washed out several roads and bridges, including a few SEPTA rail lines. In addition, the rainfall destroyed 241 homes and damaged 1,386 others. Flooding at a Dodge dealership totaled 150 vehicles. Hundreds of people were forced to be rescued from damaged buildings from flood waters. The flooding dislodged a clothes dryer in the basement of the "A" building of the Village Green Apartment Complex in Upper Moreland Township, breaking a natural gas line. The gas leak resulted in an explosion and an ensuing fire that killed six people. Firefighters were unable to render assistance as the building was completely surrounded by floodwaters. Additionally, one man drowned in his vehicle in a river. Damage in Pennsylvania totaled to $215 million (2001 USD, $279 million 2012 USD).

The flooding, severe at places, closed several roads, including numerous state highways. Several people had to be rescued from high waters, though no fatalities occurred in the state. Overall damage was minimal.

Allison's rainfall damaged 24 houses and several stores, while the flooding closed several major highways in the New York City area. Overall damage was light, and no fatalities occurred in New York due to Allison.

An isolated severe thunderstorm in the outer bands of Allison produced an F1 tornado in Worcester and Middlesex Counties in Massachusetts, impacting over 100 trees and damaging one house and one small camper. A microburst in Leominster and another in Shirley damaged several trees. Lightning from the storm hit two houses, causing significant damage there but little elsewhere. The rainfall caused drainage and traffic problems. Damage in Massachusetts totaled to $400,000 (2001 USD, $520,000 2012 USD).

Aftermath

Within weeks of the disaster, President George W. Bush declared 75 counties in Texas, southern Louisiana, southern Mississippi, northwestern Florida, and southeastern Pennsylvania as disaster areas. The declarations allowed affected citizens to receive aid for temporary housing, emergency home repairs, and other serious disaster-related expenses. The Federal Emergency Management Agency (FEMA) also provided 75% for the cost of debris removal, emergency services related to the disaster, and repairing or replacing damaged public facilities, such as roads, bridges and utilities.

A few weeks after Allison, FEMA opened six disaster recovery centers across southeast Texas, which provided recovery information to those who applied for disaster assistance. The American Red Cross and the Salvation Army opened 48 shelters at the peak of need for people driven from their homes, which served nearly 300,000 meals. The National Disaster Medical System deployed a temporary hospital to Houston with 88 professionals, aiding nearly 500 people. Thirty-five volunteer services provided aid for the flood victims in Texas, including food, clothing, and volunteers to help repair the houses. After nearly 50,000 cars were flooded and ruined, many people attempted to sell the cars across the country without telling of the car's history. Following the extreme flooding, a mosquito outbreak occurred, though FEMA provided aid to control the problem. By six months after the storm, around 120,000 Texas citizens applied for federal disaster aid, totaling to $1.05 billion (2001 USD).

Like in Texas, a mosquito outbreak occurred in Louisiana. Only pesticides acceptable to the US Environmental Protection Agency and the US Fish and Wildlife Service were allowed to be used. FEMA officials warned homeowners of the dangers of floodwaters, including mold, mildew, and bacteria. By three months after the storm, just under 100,000 Louisiana citizens applied for federal aid, totaling to over $110 million (2001 USD, $143 million 2012 USD). $25 million (2001 USD, $32 million 2012 USD) of the total was for business loans, while an additional $8 million was for public assistance for communities and state agencies. More than 750 flood victims in Florida applied for governmental aid, totaling to $1.29 million (2001 USD, $1.5 million 2007 USD). In Pennsylvania, 1,670 flood victims applied for federal aid, totaling to $11.5 million (2001 USD, $14.3 million 2012 USD). $3.4 million (2001 USD, $4.4 million 2012 USD) of the total was to replace a SEPTA rail bridge over Sandy Run in Fort Washington.

Retirement

Due to the severe damage and deaths caused by the storm, the name Allison was retired from future use in the Atlantic basin in the spring of 2002. The name was replaced with Andrea in the 2007 season. Allison is one of two Atlantic tropical systems to have its name retired without reaching hurricane strength, the other is Tropical Storm Erika of 2015.

See also

 1960 Texas tropical storm
 Tropical Storm Amelia (1978)
 Tropical Storm Claudette (1979)
 Tropical Storm Allison (1989)
 Tropical Storm Alberto (1994) 
 Tropical Storm Lee (2011)
 Tropical Storm Claudette (2021)
 Hurricane Harvey (2017) – another damaging tropical cyclone that stalled over southeastern Texas, flooding the region, and becoming the wettest tropical cyclone recorded in the U.S.
 Tropical Storm Imelda (2019)
 List of Atlantic hurricanes
 List of North Carolina hurricanes (2000–present)
 List of tropical cyclones
 List of wettest tropical cyclones in the United States
 Timeline of the 2001 Atlantic hurricane season

References

External links

 National Hurricane Center Tropical Cyclone Report on Allison
 US National Hurricane Center Tropical Storm Allison advisory archive
 Affects Of Tropical Storm Allison In Houston
 wpc Rainfall Summary for Allison
 NWS Service Assessment (PDF)
 Tropical Storm Allison Recovery Project Community resources and continuing research of the continued flood threat to Houston

 
2001 Atlantic hurricane season
Hurricanes in Louisiana
Houston hurricanes
Retired Atlantic hurricanes
Tropical cyclones that lingered over Texas
Atlantic tropical storms
Tropical Storm Allison
2001 in Louisiana
Floods in Louisiana
2001 in Texas
June 2001 events in the United States
Floods in Texas
Floods in Pennsylvania
Allison
2001 in Pennsylvania